An Chang-rim (born 2 March 1994) is a South Korean retired judoka.

An is currently the world champion in the lightweight division. He began his rise as one of judo's top lightweights by becoming junior World Champion. It was followed by a two-year podium streak, including wins at the prestigious Grand Slam Abu Dhabi and Tokyo. He is known for his physical, aggressive style of fighting, and is a versatile stylist of seoi nage.

An won a bronze medal at the 2015 World Championships. South Korea's premier lightweight, he represented Korea at the 2016 Olympics. He was also seeded first at the Olympics. He is currently ranked fourth in the world. In December 2021 he officially announced retirement.

Early life
An was born to third generation Zainichi Korean parents. He wanted to compete for South Korea from a young age, saying "I was never discriminated against here [in South Korea]."

An began judo in first grade. He attended Kyoto City Hachijo Junior High School, where he began to compete. He was unable to compete internationally for Japan because he refused naturalization.

Before moving to Korea, An was a student at the University of Tsukuba, where he trained and was teammates with 2015 World Champion Takanori Nagase. He was the 2013 All Japan University lightweight champion. He currently attends and trains at Yong In University.

Career

2014 World Judo Championships

An began his competitive senior career in 2014, representing Korea at the 2014 World Judo Championships. He competed in the −73 kg category, after local lightweight number one Wang Ki-chun missed the tournament. He lost in the second round to Israeli champion Sagi Muki.

2014 World Junior Judo Championships

An had a breakthrough in his junior career, winning the 2014 World Junior Championships in Fort Lauderdale. He won against Japan's Yuji Yamamoto in the final, scoring two waza-aris for ippon.

2014 Grand Prix Jeju
An won his first IJF circuit title at the 2014 Grand Prix in Jeju, beating established opponents such as 2008 European Champion Dirk Van Tichelt in the semi-finals, and future European Champion Sagi Muki in the finals, both by ippon.

2014 Grand Slam Tokyo
An competed in his first Grand Slam in 2014, at the heart of judo in Tokyo. He lost to double world champion Shohei Ono in the quarter-finals, and Ono would prove to be a stumbling block later on in his career. He won his first Grand Slam medal against Rustam Orujov in the bronze medal contest, winning narrowly by yuko.

2015 Grand Prix Dusseldorf
An again had a fairly successful outing at the Grand Prix in Düsseldorf, where he was guaranteed a medal by beating Muki by ippon in the quarter-finals. However, he was again faced against his budding rival Ono, and lost in the semi-finals. He won a bronze medal by defeating Victor Scvortov.

2015 European Open Warsaw
An continued his medal-winning streak at the European Open in Warsaw, reaching the final after winning all his fights en-route by ippon. He faced his first opponent from Asia in the tournament with Mongolia's Odbayar Ganbataar, where Ganbataar threw him for ippon, therefore beating An to settle for silver.

2015 Asian Judo Championships
An won his first continental title at the Asian Judo Championships in Kuwait City. He defeated Sharofiddin Boltaboev in just 49 seconds by ippon.

2015 Universiade
An defeated all his opponents by ippon at home ground in Gwangju. He defeated Yamamoto again in the semi-final, and took gold against Ukraine's Dmytro Kanivets.

2015 World Judo Championships

An competed in his second world championships in Astana, Kazakhstan, and reached the semi-final. He was once again pitted against the eventual tournament winner Ono, and lost for the third time. Ono scored first with an uchi mata counter for waza-ari, and An leveled the scores by scoring waza-ari with a minute and a half to go. Ono sealed his win with an ushiro goshi, ending An's hopes of becoming Korea's third lightweight world champion, after Lee Won-hee and Wang.

He then went on to win by shido against Ganbataar in the bronze-medal contest, becoming one of South Korea's five individual medalists at the championships.

In the team competition, Korea faced Mongolia in the semi-finals. An faced Ganbataar and beat him for a second time in Astana with a seoi nage to win by ippon in just ten seconds. Korea won 4–1, and was set against Japan in the finals.

An's opponent in the team final was double world champion and the 2015 silver medalist Riki Nakaya. Japan was one up after former world champion Masashi Ebinuma beat current world champion An Baul, putting pressure on An. An beat Nakaya by ippon with his signature skill seoi nage. Korea eventually lost to Japan 3–2, and had to settle for silver.

2015 Grand Slam Abu Dhabi
An won his first Grand Slam at Abu Dhabi, winning all his fights by ippon with the exception of the quarter-final against half-lightweight Olympic champion Lasha Shavdatuashvili. He beat Germany's Igor Wandtke for the gold medal.

2015 Grand Prix Jeju
An had a re-match with van Tichelt again in the final for the second year running at the Grand Slam in Jeju. He defeated the Belgian once again by ippon.

2015 Grand Slam Tokyo

An faced his senior from the University of Tsukuba, world champion Hiroyuki Akimoto, in the final. After the match he said to The Japan News, "Two years ago at this event I was Hiroyuki-san's attendant. I intended to send him into retirement." He lost to Akimoto by waza-ari, settling for silver.

2016 Grand Slam Paris

At his first outing to one of the IJF circuit's most prestigious events, An managed to win his second Grand Slam title. He had a re-match with Akimoto in the semi-final, and this time emerged victorious, winning by ippon and waza-ari. He defeated Russia's Denis Iartcev in the final. After winning the gold medal, An spoke to L'esprit du Judo, a French judo magazine. He answered their questions in Japanese, and was quoted saying, "I will win the Olympic final against Ono."

2016 Grand Prix Dusseldorf
An again faced his rival Ono in the semi-final at the Grand Prix in Düsseldorf, and lost for the fourth time. He ended up winning bronze against Mongolia's Khadbataar Narankhuu.

2018 Baku World Championship
An, for the first time, won the World Championship title. In the final he ended up going against his rival, Soichi Hashimoto from Japan. An beat Hashimoto with a Kosoto-gake which lead him to his first World Championship title.

2021

In 2021, he won the gold medal in his event at the 2021 Judo World Masters held in Doha, Qatar.

Competitive record

(as of 30 November 2019)

References

External links

 
 
 
 
 http://www.oasport.it/2015/12/judo-73-kg-orujov-in-testa-sfida-perenne-tra-ono-e-nakaya-bagarre-azzurra/

Living people
1994 births
South Korean male judoka
Judoka at the 2016 Summer Olympics
Olympic judoka of South Korea
Universiade medalists in judo
Zainichi Korean people
Sportspeople from Kyoto
World judo champions
Judoka at the 2018 Asian Games
Asian Games silver medalists for South Korea
Asian Games bronze medalists for South Korea
Asian Games medalists in judo
Medalists at the 2018 Asian Games
Universiade gold medalists for South Korea
Medalists at the 2015 Summer Universiade
Judoka at the 2020 Summer Olympics
Medalists at the 2020 Summer Olympics
Olympic medalists in judo
Olympic bronze medalists for South Korea
21st-century South Korean people